Best Funeral Ever is an American reality television series that aired on the TLC cable network, beginning January 6, 2013.

The show took place at the Golden Gate Funeral Home in Dallas, Texas, an African-American family-operated business, and centered primarily on over-the-top and extravagant funerals carried out by the families of the recently deceased.

One notable funeral was that of Ronnie Ray Smith, a gold medal winner at the 1968 Summer Olympics (his funeral featured his casket "running" a 100-yard dash and being given a gold medal at the end).

Episodes

Season 1 (2013)

Season 2 (2014)

References

External links
 

2010s American reality television series
2013 American television series debuts
2014 American television series endings
English-language television shows
Television shows set in Dallas
TLC (TV network) original programming